Randy Cooke is a Canadian drummer, percussionist, session musician, and touring musician.

Biography
Influenced by his drummer father, Cooke picked up the drums as a child, learning and playing as part of a local drum corps before starting his own bands as a teenager. After high school, he took his talents to the recording studio and the national stage, recording and/or touring with the likes of FM, Lee Aaron, Strange Advance, Marc Jordan, Rik Emmett, Amy Sky, Sass Jordan, Kim Mitchell, Edwin, Alannah Myles, and Alanis Morissette, and quickly emerged as one of Canada's top session musicians.

In 2004, Cooke relocated to Los Angeles and has since worked with some of music's biggest names. Shortly after his move, he was selected to record and tour with Dave Stewart of Eurythmics. Impressed, Stewart recommended Cooke to Ringo Starr, who was looking for a band to back him up as he began the promotional circuit for his solo album, Liverpool 8. Cooke got the spot and would accompany Starr on drums on The Rachel Ray Show and at the European Capital Of Culture Celebration, among other major appearances. Since moving to the US, he has also toured and/or recorded with Five for Fighting, Kelly Clarkson, Hilary Duff, Smash Mouth, Natasha Bedingfield, Ian Gillan (of Deep Purple), Colin Hay (of Men at Work), Pointer Sisters, Colbie Caillat, Mick Jagger, Ashley Tisdale, David Archuleta, The Veronicas, K'naan, Mandy Moore, and Taylor Hicks. He has also appeared on Jay Leno, David Letterman, Regis & Kelly, A&E Private Sessions, Larry King, CBS Early Show, The View, and Martha Stewart, endorsed a brand of signature "Randy Cooke" drumsticks available at retail for leading manufacturer Regal Tip, and been featured as a drummer/percussionist on several major releases.

Credits

References 

Living people
Year of birth missing (living people)
Place of birth missing (living people)
Canadian rock drummers
Canadian male drummers